Suh Jung is a South Korean actress. Suh was cast in the lead in The Isle (2000), Yellow Flower (2002), Spider Forest (2004), Green Chair (2005) and Desert Dream (2007).

Filmography

Film

Television series

Awards and nominations

References 

1972 births
Living people
South Korean film actresses